Hexatheca is a genus of flowering plants belonging to the family Gesneriaceae.

Its native range is Borneo.

Species:

Hexatheca dolichopoda 
Hexatheca fulva 
Hexatheca johannis-winkleri

References

Didymocarpoideae
Gesneriaceae genera